Ua Máel Fogmair I was the first diocesan Bishop of Killala, until 1137.

References

12th-century Roman Catholic bishops in Ireland
Bishops of Killala
1137 deaths
Year of birth missing